Esther Martín-Pozuelo Aranda (born 8 October 1998) is a Spanish footballer who plays as a defender for Levante Las Planas.

Club career
Martín-Pozuelo started her career at Daimiel.

References

External links
Profile at La Liga

1998 births
Living people
Women's association football defenders
Spanish women's footballers
Sportspeople from the Province of Ciudad Real
Footballers from Castilla–La Mancha
Real Madrid Femenino players
Valencia CF Femenino players
Primera División (women) players